Sukhpal Singh Khaira (born 13 January 1965) is an Indian Politician serving as Congress MLA from Bholath constituency as his 3rd term. He was the Leader of Opposition in Punjab Legislative Assembly during July 2017 to July 2018.

He started his political career with Youth Congress. In 1997, He became vice President of Punjab Youth Congress. He got political legacy from his father Sukhjinder Singh Khaira, stalwart Akali leader.

Personal life 
Sukhpal Singh Khaira is the son of veteran Akali leader and former Punjab education minister Sukhjinder Singh Khaira.

He did his schooling from Bishop Cotton School, Shimla.

Political career 
In 1994, he was elected as Member Panchayat from Village Ramgarh, District Kapurthala. In 1997, he joined the Youth congress and was appointed vice president of Punjab Youth Congress. In 1999, Punjab Pradesh Congress Committee appointed him as secretary of their organisation. In 2005 he was appointed president of Kapurthala district's Congress committee (2005 to 2010). In 2006, he became elected director of Central Cooperative Bank, Kapurthala.

Member of Legislative Assembly 2007 - 2012 
In 2007 he was elected as Member of Legislative Assembly from Bholath till 2012 under the Congress party, Kapurthala, Punjab after two failed attempts in 1997 and 2002.
In 2009 he was appointed Punjab Congress Spokesperson and was reappointed in 2013. He later resigned in 2014 from the post, owning moral responsibility for the "poor performance" of the party in the 2014 Lok Sabha polls in the state.

On 25 December Khaira announced his resignation from Congress party and declared his unification with the Aam Aadmi Party.

Member of Legislative Assembly 2017 - 2021 
On 11 March 2017, Khaira won the Member of Legislative Assembly elections second time after failing in 2012 in his constituency of Bholath, however this time acting under the Aam Aadmi Party.

In 2018 he was Suspended from AAP for anti party activities. He formed Punjab Democratic Alliance On 6 January 2019, Khaira left Aam Aadmi Party. 

On 8 January 2019, he formed a new political party, Punjab Ekta Party. On 16 March 2019, Punjab Democratic Alliance announced his candidacy from Bathinda parliamentary constituency. 

On 25 April 2019 he resigned from Punjab Legislative Assembly. On 23 May 2019, he lost from the Bathinda Lok Sabha Constituency.

Member of Legislative Assembly 2022 - present 
On 10 March, Khaira won the Member of Legislative Assembly election third time from Bholath, this time as an Indian National Congress candidate. The Aam Aadmi Party gained a strong 79% majority in the sixteenth Punjab Legislative Assembly by winning 92 out of 117 seats in the 2022 Punjab Legislative Assembly election. MP Bhagwant Mann was sworn in as Chief Minister on 16 March 2022. Congress party got only 18 seats and became an opposition party.

Controversies 
Sukhpal Singh Khaira admitted to meeting Arvind Kejriwal in early 2015. According to media the meeting was in pretext to join AAP Punjab, but prominent leaders of AAP Punjab blocked the entry of Khaira into the Party. In 2018, he was removed as the Leader of Opposition of the Punjab assembly, because of his problems with the party.

Allegations were made on Khaira that he was trying to protect trans-border Heroin smuggler Gurdev Singh, he rubbished the allegations and invited the enquiry. However, in April 2018, Justice Mehtab Singh Gill Panel, constituted by Govt., declared that all 17 cases against Sukhpal Singh Khaira were falsely registered and demanded action against police officers.

References

External links
 
 

Living people
Punjab, India MLAs 2022–2027
1965 births
Punjabi people
People from Kapurthala district
Punjab, India MLAs 2012–2017
Leaders of the Opposition in Punjab, India
Punjab, India MLAs 2017–2022
Former members of Aam Aadmi Party from Punjab
Indian National Congress politicians from Punjab, India
Bishop Cotton School Shimla alumni